Azersu Open Joint Stock Company is in charge of policy and strategy for the water supply and sanitation services in Azerbaijan. The Company makes necessary arrangements for extraction of water from sources followed by treatment, transportation, and sales and takes necessary actions for wastewater treatment. Azersu OJSC engages in the design, construction, operation, and maintenance of intake structures, reservoirs, pumping stations, water pipelines and sewerage collectors. The Company supplies 1434738 consumers with drinking water across the country according to status of August 1, 2018. Total served subscribers include 1354783 household and around 58878 non-household. 18244 kilometers of water lines, 3507 km of sewerage and stormwater lines under control of the company.

Today, projects are being implemented for reconstruction of water supply and sewerage systems in urban and rural areas of Azerbaijan. The projects are financed by state funds and loans allocated by international financing institutions.

The number of employees of "Azersu" OJSC is 12500 according to status data as 1 January 2018.

The Chairman of Azersu OJSC is Gorkhmaz Huseynov since 2011. First Deputy Chairman is Teyyub Jabbarov, Deputies Chairman are Kocharli Hasanov, Seymur Seyidov, and Ilgar Taghiyev.

History 
Water supply history of Baku starts from the 18th century. As said in the historical sources, 3 water pipelines associated with the names of Baku Khans were built in the city at the end of the 18th century. In the north of Baku, “Shah” water pipeline which takes its source from 3 springs in the plateau was installed in the 1720s. This pipeline entered the city in the direction of the area which presently homes the metro station “Icherysheher”. “Shah” water pipeline mainly provided Shirvanshahlars` Palace and habitations around it with drinking water.

In 1993, as Azerbaijan gained an independence, the Government began to eliminate the difficulties in all fields in the country, as well as in the field of water supply and sanitation systems. In this regard, Absheron Regional Water Company was established in 1995 to develop water supply and sewerage systems in Baku, Absheron Peninsula and Sumgayit within the framework of  National Assembly of Azerbaijan`s Order.

Under the reforms and improvements performed according to Order of the President of Azerbaijan dated June 11, 2004 “On improvement of management in field of water supply system in the Republic of Azerbaijan” Absheron Regional Joint Stock Water Company was changed into Azersu Open Joint Stock Company and institutions and offices of Bakykanalizasiya Production Union of Baku City Executive Power and Azersukanaltemir and Azerkendsutejhizat production unions were given to its subordination.

All shares of the Company belong to the state. As a result of structural reforms aimed at supplying population safe and quality drinking water and sanitation services in the regions, "United Sukanal" LLC was established. The water supply and sewerage service enterprises, which operate parallel in the same district or city, have been transformed into mobile organizations.

Duties of the Company 
Azersu OJSC's responsibilities include the managing the subordinate institutions, keeping under control, as well as organizing their actions in order to organize water supply and sewage service across the country, the creation of sanitary-preservation areas. The company also takes water from water sources for water supply, provides the drilling of water wells for supplying the reservoirs, as well as relevant residential areas with drinking water, and provides every and each household, as well as non-household with water meters (both mechanical and smart-card water meters).

Azersu OJSC also envisaged in the establishment of water reservoirs and controls their activity, takes measures to protect the environment and achieve equitable access to safe and affordable fresh water for all, organizes control over the quality of freshwater, analysis samples taken from industrial wastewaters in accordance with international standards.  The Company makes proposals for the preparation and adoption of general rules for water supply and sewage services; participate in the fulfillment of state programmes on the improvement of water supply and sewage system.

Azersu OJSC cooperates with international financial institutions, the relevant organization to involve technical and financial support in funding the projects for improvement and development of water supply and sewage system.

Structure of Azersu OJSC

"Birləşmiş Sukanal" LLC (United Sukanal) 
United Sukanal Limited Liability Company was established in accordance with the Presidential Order dated June 11, 2004. Its responsibilities are rendering service on drinking water supply and sewerage systems to customers in rayons, settlements, and villages. The company has offices in 53 regions serving 300 thousand household and 10 thousand non-household customers according to the status of 2018

“Sukanal” SRDI 
In 1995 “Sukanal” Scientific Research and Design Institute was created within the framework of the Decree of President of Azerbaijan. The Institute engages in water supply and sewerage systems design in a centralized manner across the country. In parallel, the institute is responsible for designing sewerage collectors, drainage systems, water reservoirs, pumping stations, etc.

"Sukanal" SRDI has got a license for designing buildings and facilities in accordance with the Licensing Regulations approved by Presidential Decree on 21 December 2015. Over 100 experts work in the Institute among which honored engineers, doctors of sciences and nominee doctors.

Baku Sukanal Department 
“Baku Sukanal” Department of Azersu OJSC was established in order to render drinking water supply and sewerage services to the capital residents. There are 13 central water reservoirs (total capacity: 949,2 thousand cubic meters), more than 40 pumping stations and 6 treatment plants, as well as water lines with the total length of 4700 km and sewerage network with the total length of 1480 km under service of the department.

“Sutikinti” Institution 
“Sutikinti” Institution engages in the construction and reconstruction of water and sewerage networks, as well as other objects belonging to Azersu OJSC and its subdivisions. The Institution provides the usage of scientific and technological achievements and the application of the latest technology.

Central laboratory 
The Central Laboratory of Azersu OJSC was constructed in 2013. The laboratory operates in 2 directions: analyses of drinking water and analyses of wastewater. Each division includes physical, chemical and microbiology analyses. The building `s area is 1800 square meters.

The chemical and physical analyses are carried out in the sewerage division. The division is responsible for the determination of the level of pollution in residential areas, urban and rural areas, controls the quality of treated wastewater.

See also
Open joint-stock company
Jeyranbatan Ultrafiltration Water Treatment Plants Complex

References

External links 

Economy of Azerbaijan